Leonard Dunlap (born June 25, 1949) was an American football player who played cornerback in the NFL in the 1970s. He attended the University of North Texas and was drafted by the Baltimore Colts in the 1971 NFL Draft.

References

Living people
American football cornerbacks
Kilgore Rangers football players
North Texas Mean Green football players
Baltimore Colts players
San Diego Chargers players
Detroit Lions players
1949 births